The RBE2 (Radar à Balayage Electronique 2 plans) is a multirole radar developed during the 1990s for the Dassault Rafale, a French combat aircraft.  The original RBE2 is a passive electronically scanned array. This has since been developed into the RBE2-AA, an active electronically scanned array.

Development 
Development of the RBE2 began in 1989 as a joint project between Thomson-CSF's RCM division and Dassault Electronique which merged in 1998 to form Thomson-CSF Detexis.  Development was continued by Thomson-CSF's successor company, Thales Group.

The RBE2 is a passive electronically scanned array (PESA), an electronically scanned radar with a single transmitter. Flight trials of the RBE2 began in 1992 and the first production radar was delivered in May 1997.

In April 2002, the French defence procurement agency, Délégation Générale pour l'Armement (DGA), awarded Thales Group a contract to develop an active electronically scanned array (AESA) radar demonstrator based on the RBE2 radar. The resulting RBE2-AA (active array) variant has been tested on a Mirage 2000 testbed aircraft from the Flight Test Center of the DGA and then on a Rafale. While the first tests were made with US-made transmitter-receivers, the current radar features parts manufactured by Thales. The radar uses about 838 GaAs T/R modules.

In July 2004, DGA awarded a 90 million-euro contract for the development of a second a AESA radar demonstrator. Production of the RBE2-AA commenced in 2008 and entered service in 2013.

See also
 Optronique secteur frontal (OSF)
 Euroradar CAPTOR

References

External links
 Thales Group: Active Electronically Scanned Array - AESA RBE2 radar

Aircraft radars
Military radars of France
Thales Group